Blood Bath at Orc's Drift is a supplement published by Citadel Miniatures in 1985 for the second edition of the fantasy wargame Warhammer.

Contents
Blood Bath at Orc's Drift is a wargame pack consisting of four scenarios that lead up to a major battle. The contents include:
 a scenario book
 command sheets
 cardstock buildings
 cardboard counters
 a poster map
 a badge

Publication history
Blood Bath at Orc's Drift was designed by Gary Chalk, Joe Dever and Ian Page, with artwork by Chalk and cartography by David Andrews. Citadel Miniatures also produced a line of 25 mm miniatures to match the warriors in each scenario, and offered consumers a special deal to buy them for use with this supplement.

Chalk designed the supplement after the 1964 British movie Zulu starring Michael Caine and Stanley Baker.

Reception
Jon Sutherland reviewed Blood Bath at Orc's Drift for White Dwarf #68, giving it an overall rating of 9 out of 10, and stated that "If you like Warhammer, you'll love Blood Bath at Orcs Drift - it's not often that something like this is attempted and never has it been done so well. The years of wargaming experience behind it really show through. Unreservedly recommended, it's a must for all Warhammer addicts."

References

Warhammer supplements